USS Eagle, was a ship which served in the United States Navy in 1813-1815. Originally a merchant sloop, she was purchased at Vergennes, Vermont on Lake Champlain in 1812 and fitted  as either sloop of war or brig for naval service. The British captured her in 1813 and renamed her HMS Finch, only to lose her back to the Americans at the Battle of Lake Champlain in 1814. She was sold in 1815.

American service and capture
She cruised on the lake under the command of Sailing Master J. Loomis as a member of Commodore Thomas Macdonough's squadron blockading the British advance from Canada. Major George Taylor of the 100th Regiment captured Eagle on 3 June 1813 on the Sorrell River near Ile aux Noix on the Canadian side of the lake, after a fight of three-and-a-half hours; British casualties were three men wounded and American casualties were one man killed and eight severely wounded. (Both vessels were taken into Royal Navy service, but the Americans recaptured them the next year.) The British took her into the Royal Navy as HMS Shannon but later renamed her HMS Chubb.

British service and recapture

Finch accompanied the expedition that burned the arsenal and storehouses at Plattsburgh, New York. She was under the command of Lieutenant William Hicks on 11 September 1814 at the Battle of Lake Champlain. She was bringing up the rear of the British line together with some gunboats. She was ordered to sail towards and engage the USS Preble, a sloop of seven guns. As she did so, the schooner USS Ticonderoga fired on Finch shooting away her rigging. Finch ran aground near Crab Island where a small American shore battery commenced firing on her. Unable to free herself, and with two men wounded, Hicks struck the colors.

Fate
After the Americans recaptured Finch they took her back into the U.S. Navy under her original name. After the war, she was sold in July 1815 at Whitehall, New York.

See also
List of sloops of war of the United States Navy
List of ships captured in the 19th century

Footnotes
Notes

Citations

References

Silverstone, Paul H. (2001) The Sailing Navy, 1775-1854. (Annapolis, MD: Naval Institute Press) ISBN 1- 55750-893-3

Sloops of the United States Navy
War of 1812 ships of the United States
Finch
1812 ships
Vessels captured from the United States Navy
Vessels captured by the United States Navy
Captured ships